Pigen og vandpytten is a 1958 Danish family film directed by Bent Christensen and starring Lily Broberg.

Cast
Lily Broberg as Mai Grøndahl
Preben Mahrt as Erik Thorbjørn
Buster Larsen as Teaterdirektører
Christian Arhoff as Rasmus Frederik Christian Block
Kjeld Petersen as Forfatter
Dirch Passer as Fabrikant Munk
Marguerite Viby as Fru Hammer
Sigrid Horne-Rasmussen as Direktør Stella
Bodil Steen as Baronesse Grunenskjold
Povl Wøldike as Baron Grunenskjold
Preben Uglebjerg as Peter
Caja Heimann as Veninde af Mai
Bjørn Puggaard-Müller as Svend Aasgaard
Karl Stegger as Bogtrykker
Henry Nielsen - Portneren Lasse
Ole Monty as Overtjener
Vivi Bach as Gæst i restaurant
Johannes Marott as Andersen
Jørgen Beck as Scenemester
Bjørn Spiro as Betjent
Axel Strøbye as Journalist
Ib Glindemann as Kapelmester (uncredited)

External links

1958 films
1950s Danish-language films
Danish black-and-white films
Films directed by Bent Christensen